Ana Yorkira Binet Stephens (born February 9, 1992) is a volleyball player from the Dominican Republic. She was born in Sánchez, Samaná.

Career

2008
She participated as the libero for her Girls U-18 National Team at the 2008 NORCECA Girls Youth Continental Championship U-18 held in Guaynabo, Puerto Rico. There, her team won the bronze medal and she won the Best Receiver and Best Defense awards.

2009
With her National Junior Team to win the Silver Medal playing as wing spiker, at the 2009 U20 World Championship, at Mexicali, Mexico. She competed for her native country at the 2009 FIVB Girls' U18 Volleyball World Championship in Nakhon Ratchasima, Thailand, wearing the number #6 jersey and playing as wing spiker. There she ended up in 11th place.

2010
At the 2010 Hato Mayor Beach Volleyball Tournament beach volleyball (three) with Niverka Marte and Marianne Fersola, they won the gold medal.

After winning the gold medal at the 2010 Pan-American Cup with the senior team, she won the silver medal at the 2010 NORCECA Junior Continental Championship U-20.

In late September, she participated with her Senior Nacional Team who won the gold medal at the 2010 Final Four Cup.

2011
Binet played at Hato Mayor, winning the gold medal in the annual Sport Festival in Beach Volleyball (three), playing with Altagracia Mambrú and Niverka Marte.

Clubs
  Samaná (2006)
  Distrito Nacional (2007–2008)
  Santo Domingo (2008)
  Espaillat (2010)
  Puñal (2010)
  Mirador (2010)
  Malanga Manoguayabo (2011)
  Mirador (2015)

Awards

Individuals
 2007 Dominican Volleyball League "Best Libero"
 2007 Dominican Volleyball League "Best Defense"
 2007 Dominican Volleyball League "Best Receiver"
 2008 NORCECA Girls Youth Continental Championship U-18 "Best Defense"
 2008 NORCECA Girls Youth Continental Championship U-18 "Best Receiver"
 2010 NORCECA Junior Continental Championship U-20 "Best Scorer"

National Team

Senior Team
 2010 Final Four Cup -  Gold Medal
 2010 Central American and Caribbean Games -  Gold Medal
 2010 Pan-American Cup -  Gold Medal
 2009 NORCECA Championship,  Gold Medal
 2009 Final Four Cup -  Bronze Medal

Junior Team
 2010 NORCECA Women´s Junior Continental Championship U-20  Silver Medal
 2009 FIVB U20 Volleyball World Championship  Silver Medal
 2008 NORCECA Women´s Junior Continental Championship U-20  Silver Medal
 2006 NORCECA Girls Youth Continental Championship U-18  Silver Medal

Clubs
 2007 & 2008 Dominican Republic Volleyball League -  Champion, with Distrito Nacional

Beach volleyball
 2010 Hato Mayor Beach Volleyball Tournament  Gold Medal
 2011 Hato Mayor Beach Volleyball Tournament  Gold Medal

References

External links
 FIVB Profile
 Dominican Republic National Volleyball Federation

1992 births
Living people
Dominican Republic women's volleyball players
Volleyball players at the 2015 Pan American Games
Pan American Games bronze medalists for the Dominican Republic
Pan American Games medalists in volleyball
Central American and Caribbean Games gold medalists for the Dominican Republic
Competitors at the 2010 Central American and Caribbean Games
Competitors at the 2014 Central American and Caribbean Games
Liberos
Wing spikers
Central American and Caribbean Games medalists in volleyball
Medalists at the 2015 Pan American Games